The MPL Philippines Season 10 is the tenth season of the MPL Philippines. The season began on August 12, 2022, and ended on October 23, 2022. The season served as the Philippine Qualifiers for the MLBB M4 World Championships slated on January 1–15, 2023. It was won by Blacklist International.

Venues and Competition Format

Venue 
After the league runs online for two years due to the COVID-19 pandemic, the league has opened doors to the live audience which began last August 12. However, the league has set some rules for the fans who wish to witness the games personally. Fans must present proof of vaccination and return a negative antigen test result in the day they wish to witness the games. 90 fans can be accommodated for Fridays and Sundays, 70 fans can be accommodated for Saturdays.

The games for the regular season are being held in iCite Auditorium, Bagumbayan, Quezon City.

Competition Format 
Similar to the previous season, 8 teams will compete in a double round-robin elimination and only the Top 6 teams will qualify for the playoffs. However, the first and third-placed teams will have the advantage of selecting matchups in the play-in rounds. Only the Grand Finalists will represent the Philippines in the upcoming MLBB M4 World Championships.

Regular Season 
The regular season began on August 12, 2022, and will end on October 03, 2022. The regular season are a double round-robin format, with each team playing against their opponents twice, for a total of 14 games being played per team. A total of three group stage points may be earned in a single regular season match, based on the following:
 If the match is decided by a 2–0 score, the winner shall earn 3 group stage points, while the loser earns 0 group stage points.
 If the match is decided by a 2–1 score, the winner shall earn 2 group stage points, while the loser earns 1 group stage point.
The top two teams of the standings gained outright qualification to the Upper Bracket Semifinals, while the next four teams qualified for the play-ins.

On September 24, 2022, the league announced the suspension of games scheduled for September 25 (Week 7-Day 3), in light of the onslaught of Typhoon Karding (international name: Typhoon Noru), which had hit different parts of Luzon. However, it was announced that suspended games due to the typhoon are rescheduled on October 03, 2022, which will mean the final week of the Regular Season will run for four days, with the regular season officially ending on October 03, 2022.

Playoffs 
On September 29, the league announced that the playoff games (including the Grand Finals) are to be played in The Blue Leaf Cosmopolitan in Quezon City, and will be held from October 20–23, 2022.

All matches will be in a best-of-5 series, except for the Grand Finals, which will be a best-of-7 series.

Play-ins 
Play-ins were a best-of-five series, the winners advances to the Upper Semifinals, while the losers were eliminated.

|}

Upper Bracket Semifinals 

|}

Lower Bracket Semifinals 

|}

Upper Bracket Final 

|}

Lower Bracket Final 

|}

Grand Finals 

|}

Awards

Regular Season Weekly MVPs 
Every Week, a player from the teams that had faced off during one week of the season is awarded as the Regular Season's Weekly MVP. This tradition has been part of the achievements sections of MPL Philippines since Season 7.

Individual awards

Team of the Season

MPL Philippines Press Corps Award Night 
The MPL Philippines Press Corps posted the result of the MPL Philippines Awards Night that was held by the organization, Smart, Razer, and Evident. The following awards were given: Match of the Year, Play of the Year, Executive of the Year, Sportsmanship Award, Breakout Player of the Year, Comeback Player of the Year, Coach of the Year, Rookie of the Year, and All-MPL PH Team honors.

Hall of Legends  
The league officially introduces the "MPL Hall of Legends," a hall of fame set up by the organizing committee beginning this season. It is also the newest initiative by the league in honoring the Esports athletes who have greatly contributed to the game's growth and to Esports scene overall. According to Maui Tang, the Moonton Marketing and Business Development Specialist, he said that players, coaches, Moonton staff, and the media that are covering the league's games will comprise the voting committee. He also noted that fans will also have the power to select their choices on who makes it to the 10 inaugural inductees of the Hall of Legends. He added also that any MPL-PH professional player who have played from Season 1 up until the current season (Season 10) are eligible for nomination for induction in the Hall of Legends.

The following are the ten (10) inductees to the MPL Hall of Legends, including one (1) honorable inductee:

 Im “Coach Panda” Chang-Rok
 Christian “Rafflesia” Fajura
 Joshua “Ch4knu” Mangilog
 Jeniel “YellyHaze” Bata-Anon
 Setsuna “Dogie” Ignacio
 Angelo Kyle “Pheww” Arcangel
 Karl Gabriel “KarlTzy” Nepomuceno
 Carlito “Ribo” Ribo Jr.
 Danerie James “Wise” Del Rosario
 Johnmar “OhMyV33NUS” Villaluna
 Manjean “Manjean” Faldas

The induction ceremonies of the ten (10) inaugural awardees for the Hall of Legends were awarded during the Grand Finals of the Season.

References 

Esports competitions in the Philippines
Mobile Legends: Bang Bang competitions